Aubrey Boucicault (23 June 1868 or '6910 July 1913) was a British born stage actor, playwright and matinee idol. He came from a famous family of actors and playwrights, his father being Dion Boucicault.

Aubrey Boucicault was born in London to Dion Boucicault and Agnes Robertson and was their sixth and youngest child. Aubrey's older siblings were Dion William (1855-1876), Eva (1857-1909), Dion Jr., Patrice (1862-?1890) and Nina. On August 7, 1887, The New York Times reported that Aubrey and his mother were expected to arrive from England that day to begin their season at St. Paul theatre on August 22 in the show "My Geraldine."

Aubrey's second wife was the actress Amy Busby (1872-1957), but they divorced after only a couple years of marriage. Busby filed divorce papers naming Victory Bateman as a co-respondent presumably in a case of adultery. He was later married to Cornelia Holbrook and then to Ruth Holt. He and Holbrook had a daughter Rene Boucicault.

For the 1903 Elitch Theatre season Boucicault was the leading man for six productions in June and July, playing opposite Jane Kennark or Maude Fealy as the leading lady. His wife, Ruth Baldwin Holt, would play Elitch's in 1908.

References

External links

 portrait gallery(NY Public Library, Billy Rose Collection)
1st wife Amy Busby
3rd wife Ruth Holt(NY Public Library, Billy Rose)
The Detroit Times; June 15, 1912 --with photo of Ruth Holt at bottom
Boucicault circa 1893
Aubrey Boucicault Theatre Alumni page

1869 births
1913 deaths
Male actors from London
English people of Irish descent
English male stage actors
19th-century English male actors
20th-century English male actors